Deil is a village in the Dutch province of Gelderland. It is a part of the municipality of West Betuwe, and lies about 12 km west of Tiel.

Deil was a separate municipality until 1978, when it became a part of Geldermalsen. On januari 2019 Deil became part of a newly formed municipality, when the former municipalities of Geldermalsen, Neerijnen and Lingewaal joined together to form the municipality of West-Betuwe.

In 2019, the village of Deil had 2.097 inhabitants. The built-up area of the village was 0.38 km², and contained 840 residences. There is a restored windmill in the village, De Vlinder.

Gallery

References

Populated places in Gelderland
Former municipalities of Gelderland
West Betuwe